Alec Luyckx (born 19 May 1995) is a Belgian professional football player who currently plays for KSV Temse. He plays as a midfielder.

Club career 

Luyckx joined Waasland-Beveren in 2013 from R.S.C. Anderlecht. He made his Belgian Pro League debut at 29 March 2014 against Lierse in a 2–0 home win. He replaced Robin Henkens after 76 minutes.

On 6 January 2016, Luyckx signed a loan deal with R. Cappellen.

References

External links
 

1995 births
Living people
Belgian footballers
S.K. Beveren players
Royal Cappellen F.C. players
Belgian Pro League players
Place of birth missing (living people)
Association football midfielders
K.R.C. Gent players